The Revue suisse de Zoologie (English: Swiss Journal of Zoology) is a biannual peer-reviewed scientific journal for zoological systematics. It is published by the Natural History Museum of Geneva (Switzerland). It is financed by the Swiss Academy of Natural Sciences (SCNAT) and the City of Geneva, and mainly publishes the research results of Swiss researchers or work based on the collections of Swiss institutions.

References

External links

English-language journals
Biannual journals
Publications established in 1893
Zoology journals